Robert Richardson (21 December 1927 – 12 April 2004) was a Canadian alpine skier who competed in the 1952 Winter Olympics.

References

1927 births
2004 deaths
Canadian male alpine skiers
Olympic alpine skiers of Canada
Alpine skiers at the 1952 Winter Olympics